

The Dewey Arch was a triumphal arch that stood from 1899 to 1900 at Madison Square in Manhattan, New York.  It was erected for a parade in honor of Admiral George Dewey celebrating his victory at the Battle of Manila Bay in the Philippines in 1898.

History 
Planning for the parade, scheduled for September 1899, began in the spring of that year. The architect Charles R. Lamb built support for a triumphal arch among his fellow members of the National Sculpture Society. A committee of society members, including Lamb, Karl Bitter, Frederick W. Ruckstull, John Quincy Adams Ward and John De Witt Warner, submitted a proposal for an arch to the City of New York, which approved the plan in July 1899.

With only two months remaining before the parade, the committee decided to build the arch and its colonnade out of staff, a plaster-based material used previously for temporary buildings at several World's Fairs. Modeled after the Arch of Titus in Rome, the Dewey Arch was decorated with the works of twenty-eight sculptors and topped by a large quadriga (modeled by Ward) depicting four horses drawing a ship. The arch was illuminated at night with electric light bulbs.

After the parade on September 30, 1899, the arch began to deteriorate. An attempt to raise money to rebuild it in stone (as had been done for the arch in Washington Square Park) failed, owing to the growing unpopularity of the Philippine War. The arch was demolished in 1900,  and the larger sculptures sent to Charleston for an exhibit, after which they were either destroyed or lost.

See also
 The separate Victory Arch which was built in the same place in 1918 and torn down 1920

References
Notes

Bibliography

 - Total pages: 213 

 - Total pages: 479

External links 
Bas-relief on Dewey Arch by Johannes Gelert

Buildings and structures demolished in 1900
Demolished buildings and structures in Manhattan
Triumphal arches in the United States